Cheer Up is a live album by trombonist/tubist Ray Anderson, drummer Han Bennink and guitarist Christy Doran which was released on the hat ART label in 1995.

Reception

The Allmusic review by Thom Jurek stated "This trio's first recording, the wonderful Azurety, met with acclaim by critics and music fans alike for its gleeful abandon, musically astute terrorism, and tunes that were stop-on-a-dime tight. The trio, which was initially together just for a tour, is now a working unit and this second recording proves it. ... This date is killer -- a blast to listen to. Guaranteed to cheer you up, even if you don't need it".

Track listing
All compositions by Ray Anderson except where noted
 "No Return" (Christy Doran) – 7:21
 "My Children Are the Reason Why I Need to Own My Publishing" – 4:34
 "Tabasco Cart" (Ray Anderson, Han Bennink, Christy Doran) – 10:25
 "Like Silver" – 3:57
 "Cheer Up" (Doran) – 8:48
 "Buckethead" (Anderson, Bennink, Doran) – 3:11
 "Melancholy Mood" (Horace Silver) – 5:45
 "New H.G." (Doran) – 3:54
 "Hence the Reason" – 3:46

Personnel
Ray Anderson – trombone, tuba
Han Bennink – drums
Christy Doran – guitars

References

Ray Anderson (musician) live albums
Han Bennink live albums
1995 live albums
Hathut Records live albums
Jazz albums by American artists